Country Music Radio (CMR) was a radio station broadcast throughout Europe during the 1990s via satellite.

History 
Originally called QCMR (an acronym for Quality Country Music Radio) and based in the studios of sister station QEFM in Camberley, the station renamed and relocated to studios in Alton, Hampshire, UK in 1994 and then to Britannia Row, Islington, London, UK in 1995.

While the station ceased full-time broadcasting by satellite in 1996, it has continued its existence using other methods of distribution including internet streaming and part-time relays via other broadcasters. CMR Hot and CMR Nashville are currently broadcasting on the internet and Lee Williams is still the owner of the franchise.

Defunct radio stations in the United Kingdom
Radio stations established in 1993
Country radio stations in the United Kingdom